Plasmodium tyrio is a parasite of the genus Plasmodium. As in all Plasmodium species, P. tyrio has both vertebrate and insect hosts. Its only known vertebrate host is the Chinese pangolin.

Taxonomy 
The parasite was first described by de Mello, Fernandes, Correia and Lobo in 1928.

Hosts
The only known host of this species is the Chinese pangolin (Manis pentadactyla).

References 

tyrio